Playdate is a handheld video game console developed by Panic. As well as buttons and a directional pad, the device has a mechanical crank on its side. The console was first announced on May 22, 2019 on the cover of Edge magazine, and was released on April 18, 2022.  The name references its weekly release schedule of games.

Hardware 

The device is small, square, and yellow, featuring a black-and-white 1-bit screen for display, with a 4 way directional pad, two game buttons, and a mechanical crank on the side. The crank, which can be used for additional inputs, can be tucked away.

It was designed in collaboration with Teenage Engineering, a Swedish consumer electronics company.

Playdate uses a Sharp Memory LCD screen similar to e-paper displays. Each pixel can remember its state (black/white) without needing to be refreshed, resulting in faster refreshing and lower power usage, while also being "viewable in any light, from edge-of-vision darkness (social media claim, disproven)  to brightest sunlight," with a wide 170° viewing angle.

Accessories 
Panic announced two accessories for the device, a purple Cover and a yellow Stereo Dock that charges the device, functions as a speaker, and includes a pen. The Cover was released alongside the device, while the Stereo Dock does not yet have a release date.

Games

Distribution 
Games are published by Panic in seasons, with new games being sent to the device over Wi-Fi each week. A total of 24 games are in the first season, two released per week, all included in the price of the console. The order of released games was unknown until the week they were released, and were revealed to players when they automatically downloaded.

Developers 
Video games are produced by Panic as well as notable indie game developers such as Keita Takahashi, Zach Gage, Bennett Foddy, Shaun Inman, and Chuck Jordan. Panic stated that they were interested in games created by underrepresented developers and that there were games from women, queer, trans and non-binary developers in Playdate's first season.

Season 1 (April – July 2022)

Third-party support 
The device is an open system and allows sideloading additional games that are not part of a season.

Games are created using a free SDK that includes a simulator and debugger. The SDK is compatible with both C and Lua programming languages. It is available for macOS, Windows, and Linux. Simpler tile-based games can be created using Pulp, a more-approachable game development tool from Panic.

Reception

Pre-release 
On May 22, 2019, Panic announced Playdate. Initial impressions were centered around how unusual the device was, from the crank, its 1-bit screen, and its odd method of delivering games to players. About the crank, TechCrunch noted, "It's not necessary for every game, though, so don't worry if it seems too weird."

A year before the Playdate announcement, a Panic co-founder Cabel Sasser sent an email to an indie video game event, also named Playdate, suggesting that the organizers consider tweaking or changing its name to avoid future confusion. The following day, Sasser retracted the request, stating "My intention was always to find a way for our Playdates to co-exist [...] but we remain fine with you using the name Playdate." On January 29, 2020, the team behind the event (now named "Playdate Pop Up") announced that Panic was joining the event as a sponsor, and would assist the event in petitioning for nonprofit status, however, the LA Zinefest event was cancelled due to the COVID-19 pandemic.

Release 
Playdate was initially set for release in early 2020, however preorders were delayed until July 29, 2021. Panic sold through its initial order of 20,000 units set to ship in 2021 within the first 20 minutes of its preorder. Playdates started shipping to customers on April 18, 2022.

Playdate was generally well-received upon its release, with criticism notably around the lack of a backlit screen and long shipping times. The Verge praised its initial library of games, stating "What's on offer in the initial batch of games is great," and "even in this crowded landscape, Playdate offers something entirely unique." IGN's review expressed, "the screen's lack of a backlight can be a frustrating limitation. But you know what? The Playdate charmed me and I am now fully under its spell." Input Mag wrote, "It really seems like every opportunity Panic found to do something special, it took it."

References 

Handheld game consoles
Monochrome video game consoles
2020s toys
2022 in video gaming
Products introduced in 2022
ARM-based video game consoles
Ninth-generation video game consoles